Setina roscida is a moth of the family Erebidae first described by Michael Denis and Ignaz Schiffermüller in 1775. It is found from western France through central Europe to the Volga area and the Altai.

The wingspan is 19–24 mm for males and 14–20 mm for females. The forewings are narrow and long with a yellow to orange ground colour. Individuals from the Alps have a darker colour. There are two generations per year with adults on wing from April to June and again from July to September.

The larvae feed on lichen. Larvae are found in late summer. The species overwinters in the larval stage. Pupation takes place in spring.

Subspecies
Setina roscida roscida
Setina roscida kuhlweini (Hübner, [1823-1824])

References

External links

Lepiforum e.V.
Schmetterlinge-Deutschlands.de

Moths described in 1775
Endrosina
Moths of Europe
Moths of Asia
Taxa named by Michael Denis
Taxa named by Ignaz Schiffermüller